Halt and Catch Fire is an American period drama television series created by Christopher Cantwell and Christopher C. Rogers, that aired on AMC from June 1, 2014, to October 14, 2017. The series depicts a fictionalized insider's view of the personal computer revolution of the 1980s and later the growth of the World Wide Web in the early 1990s. The series' first two seasons are set in the Silicon Prairie of Dallas–Fort Worth, while the third and fourth seasons are set in Silicon Valley. The show's title refers to computer assembly language instruction HCF, whose execution would cause the computer's central processing unit to stop working (and facetiously catch fire).

Series overview

Episodes

Season 1 (2014)

Notes

Season 2 (2015)

Season 3 (2016)

Season 4 (2017)

References

External links
 

Lists of American drama television series episodes